The 1955–56 British National League season was the second season of the British National League. Five teams participated in the league, and the Nottingham Panthers won the championship.

British National League

Regular season

Autumn Cup

Results

References

External links
 Nottingham Panthers history site

British
British National League season 1955-56
British National League season 1955-56
British National League season
British National League season 1955-56
British National League season 1955-56